Jesse Bennett Perrin (October 20, 1959 – February 3, 2017) was a professional American football safety who played four seasons for the St. Louis Cardinals in the National Football League.  Perrin played for the legendary University of Alabama football coach Paul "Bear" Bryant from 1978–1981, winning NCAA National Championships in 1978 and 1979.

Perrin attended Decatur High School in Decatur, Alabama, where he resided at the time of his death and was the owner of BB Perrins Sports Bar and Grille.

Perrin committed suicide at the age of 57 on February 3, 2017.

References

1959 births
Sportspeople from Orange County, California
Sportspeople from Decatur, Alabama
American football safeties
Alabama Crimson Tide football players
St. Louis Cardinals (football) players
Players of American football from California
2017 suicides
Suicides by firearm in Alabama